Marie-Lizza Toinette Danila (born September 17, 1982) is a Filipino former swimmer, who specialized in backstroke events. She represented the Philippines, as a 17-year-old, at the 2000 Summer Olympics, and later collected a total of six silver medals in a backstroke double at the Southeast Asian Games (1999, 2001, and 2003) before her official retirement in 2005. She is also a top 8 finalist at the 2002 Asian Games in Busan, South Korea.

Career
Danila competed only in the women's 100 m backstroke at the 2000 Summer Olympics in Sydney. She achieved a FINA B-cut of 1:06.19 after winning a silver medal from the Southeast Asian Games in Bandar Seri Begawan, Brunei. Swimming in heat one, Danila, who just turned 18 on the second day of the Games, gave the Filipinos a further reason to celebrate, as she overhauled a 1:07 barrier and rocketed to a fantastic first-place finish in a sterling time of 1:06.48. Danila's blistering triumph was not worthy enough to put her through to the semifinals, as she placed thirty-seventh overall out of 47 swimmers in the prelims.

At the 2001 Southeast Asian Games in Kuala Lumpur, Malaysia, Danila defended her silver medals each in the 100 m backstroke (1:05.10) and in the 200 m backstroke (2:23.47), finishing behind Thailand's top favorite Chonlathorn Vorathamrong by more than a full body length.

Two years later, at the 2002 Asian Games in Busan, South Korea, Danila failed to medal in any of her individual events, finishing ninth in the 100 m backstroke (1:06.44), and eighth in the 200 m backstroke (2:22.19).

References

1982 births
Living people
Filipino female swimmers
Olympic swimmers of the Philippines
Swimmers at the 2000 Summer Olympics
Swimmers at the 2002 Asian Games
Female backstroke swimmers
People from San Pablo, Laguna
Sportspeople from Laguna (province)
Southeast Asian Games medalists in swimming
Southeast Asian Games silver medalists for the Philippines
Competitors at the 1999 Southeast Asian Games
Competitors at the 2001 Southeast Asian Games
Competitors at the 2003 Southeast Asian Games
Asian Games competitors for the Philippines